Prince William Pitt Leleiohoku II (1854–1877), was a poet and composer of many Hawaiian mele (songs), mostly love songs. He was the youngest of the Na Lani ʻEhā ("Royal Four"), which included his sisters Queen Liliʻuokalani (1838–1917) and Princess Miriam Likelike (1851–1887) and his brother King David Kalākaua (1836–1891). Leleiohoku and his siblings are credited with the musical revival enjoyed by Hawaiians during the last half of the 19th century. Many of his compositions adapted folk tunes of visiting merchants, sailors, and foreign settlers.

Liliʻuokalani said that Leleiohoku had a talent for composition "really in advance" of herself and Likelike. He founded the Kawaihau Singing Club and soon he and his colleagues were winning most of the royal song club competitions. Many claimed that he had one of the best male voices among native Hawaiians.

Kāua I Ka Huahuaʻi  
Kāua I Ka Huahuaʻi, translated as "We Two in the Spray", is considered one of Leleiohoku's greatest compositions.  The song dates to the 1860s written when the Prince was 10–14 years old. It was recorded in 1913 by the Hawaiian Quintette. The song became popular around 1930, when Johnny Noble, bandleader at the Moana Hotel on Waikiki Beach, transformed it into the very jazzy: "Tahuwahuwai", better known as The Hawaiian War Chant.  Despite the English name, this song was never a war chant.  Unlike the immortal Aloha Oe of his sister Liliʻuokalani, the original lyrics of this love song are no longer popular but the melody of the song is known as "The Hawaiian War Chant". The Hawaiian lyrics describe a clandestine meeting between two lovers.

Lyrics

Nu`a O Ka Palai 
Nu`a O Ka Palai
This song can be found in Hopkin's Aloha Collection. English translation was by Mary Pukui.

Lyrics

Ke Kaʻupu  
Ke Kaʻupu translated as "albatross", composed by Lele-io-Hoku, about a sea bird, commonly known in English as an albatross; but how could a love song honor an albatross? (An alternative name is gooney).  There are two tunes to this song, the newer one from the late 1930s.

Lyrics

Wahine Hele La   
Wahine Hele La, or Wahine Hele La ʻO Kaiona, was a mele inoa (name song) composed by Leleiohoku for his relative Princess Bernice Pauahi. It was written after her visit to America accompanied by her husband, Charles Reed Bishop, who is referred to as Hiʻilei. Poʻaiʻai is the rain in Kahaluʻu, Oahu, and Kahoʻiwai is in Manoa Valley.  English translations are by Kini Sullivan.

Lyrics

Adios Ke Aloha  
Adios Ke Aloha, translates as "Goodbye My Love" and was composed by the Prince in the 1870s.  The used of the Spanish phrase adios shows Leleiohoku's influence by the music of the Mexican cowboys or vaqueros. Captain George Vancouver presented a gift of longhorn cattle to King Kamehameha I, at Kealakekua Bay, in 1793. A 10-year protection was placed on the cattle to allow them to multiply and assure the island of a constant food supply. The wild cattle became a menace, and in 1832 Kamehameha III invited 3 of Mexico's best cowboys, to teach the paniolos (as the cowboys came to be known) the art of roping. The English translations are by Mary Pukui.  Like his sister's composition, Aloha Oe, it is a farewell song to a love one.

Lyrics

Moani Ke ʻAla 
Moani Ke ʻAla may have been written for a lover and a meeting in Manoa valley. English translations by Kini Sullivan and Mary Pukui. In Moani Ke ʻAla, he poetically compares a desirable but elusive lover to the famous Puʻulena wind of Kona.

Lyrics

Others 
 Nani Wale Lihue or Nani Wali Lihu’e
 Aloha No Wau I Ko Maka
 He Inoa No Kaʻiulani (a different song from the one with the same name by Liliʻuokalani)
 Nani Waipiʻo
 Hole Waimea (co-written with his singing club)

See also 
 List of compositions by Likelike
 List of compositions by Liliʻuokalani

References 

Hawaiian music
Lists of compositions by composer
Hawaii-related lists